Baka Bukas is a 2016 Philippine romantic drama independent film written, co-produced, and directed by Samantha Lee in her feature film directorial debut. Starring Jasmine Curtis-Smith and Louise delos Reyes, the film tells the story of Alex (Curtis-Smith), a lesbian who starts falling for her best friend Jess (delos Reyes).

The film first premiered at the 2016 Cinema One Originals film festival, where it won the Audience Choice Award, Best Sound, and Best Actress award for Curtis-Smith. In 2017, Star Cinema acquired the film's distribution rights, along with that of another LGBT-themed film 2 Cool 2 Be 4gotten; it had a wide release on March 1 that year.

Plot
Alex is a 23-year-old lesbian creative who juggles multiple jobs. Her family and friends are aware of her sexual orientation except for her best friend Jess, whom she is secretly in love with. An angry phone call from Alex's ex-girlfriend reveals the truth and Jess is in disbelief that Alex managed to hide that side of herself from her. After promising that nothing will change between them, Jess starts to entertain the idea of having feelings for Alex. They kiss one night, and eventually begin to explore a romantic relationship with each other.

Being a budding actress who had her big break in the business only recently, Jess has to hide her dating life which Alex struggles with. Jess insists it could still work, but Alex decides that she has to end it. She asks Jess to give her 60 days after their break-up to move on before they can go back to being friends, but Alex is unable to hold up her end of the deal and they do not meet again until more than a year later at their mutual friend's birthday party.

Cast
Jasmine Curtis-Smith as Alex
Louise delos Reyes as Jess
Kate Alejandrino as Kate
Nelsito Gomez as David
Gio Gahol as Julo

Production

Development
Baka Bukas is Samantha Lee's directorial debut film. As a lesbian herself, Lee developed the concept for the film based on her own relationship with a female partner. Furthermore, she stated in an interview for CNN Philippines:

Lee wrote the screenplay for 10 days.

Filming
The film features a kissing scene between Jasmine Curtis-Smith and Louise delos Reyes. Though she admitted being nervous about the scene beforehand, Curtis-Smith told interviews that she was eventually comfortable in performing the scene, as was delos Reyes. The scene took three takes to finish.

Music
The film's score was composed by Denise Santos. Santos is affiliated with Bleeding Fingers Music, a partnership between noted score composer Hans Zimmer and Sony Music, where she works as an in-house composer.

Track listing
All music composed by Denise Santos, except where noted.

Release
Baka Bukas was one of the finalists at the 2016 Cinema One Originals film festival's original lineup. The film premiered on November 14–22, 2016. During the festival's awarding ceremony held at the Dolphy Theatre on November 20, Baka Bukas won three awards. The film received the Audience Choice Award and Best Sound, and the Best Actress went to Jasmine Curtis-Smith.

In February 2017, the film was confirmed to have earned distribution rights from Star Cinema. The film had a wide release on March 1.

Reception
Philbert Dy of The Neighborhood said in his review:

Oggs Cruz of Rappler said:

Accolades

References

External links

2016 films
Lesbian-related films
Philippine independent films
Philippine LGBT-related films
2010s Tagalog-language films
2016 directorial debut films
2016 LGBT-related films
LGBT-related romantic drama films
2010s English-language films